Merrill Joan Gerber (born March 15, 1938) is an American writer. She is an O. Henry Award winner.

Biography
Gerber was born in Brooklyn, New York, March 15, 1938. She received a bachelor's degree in English from the University of Florida in 1959, and a 
Masters in English from Brandeis University.

She has published thirty books, and is a novelist and short story writer.  She has published stories in The New Yorker, The Atlantic, The American Scholar, Mademoiselle, Redbook, The Sewanee Review, Salmagundi, The Southwest Review, and many other journals.  In 1986 Gerber won an O. Henry Prize. In 1993, she won the Ribalow Award from Hadassah Magazine for her novel, The Kingdom of Brooklyn. She currently teaches fiction writing at the California Institute of Technology.Her literary archive resides at the Yale Beinecke Rare Book Library.

Awards
Wallace Stegner Fiction Fellowship from Stanford University
Harold Ribalow Prize from Hadassah Magazine for The Kingdom of Brooklyn
Pushcart Editors' Book Award for King of the World

Books
Novels:
(These are also in e book format)
The Hysterectomy Waltz
The Victory Gardens of Brooklyn
Glimmering Girls
Anna in Chains
Anna in the Afterlife
King of the World
The Kingdom of Brooklyn
Now Molly Knows
The Lady With the Moving Parts
An Antique Man

She also wrote nine young adult novels

Short Stories:
"This Is A Voice From Your Past"
"Chattering Man"
"This Old Heart of Mine"
"Honeymoon"
"Stop Here, My Friend"

Memoirs:
Old Mother, Little Cat: A Writer's Reflections on her Kitten, Her Aged Mother, and Life
Botticelli Blue Skies: An American in Florence
Beauty and the Breast: A Tale of Breast Cancer, Love and Friendship

Non Fiction:
Gut Feelings: A Writer's Truths and Minute Inventions

External links
 Official website
 Official Bio from California Institute of Technology
 Merrill Joan Gerbers website
 E-Books: Sixteen of Gerber's books are available at Amazon.com, BN.com, and at www.dzancbooks.org/merrill-joan-gerber-reprint/

University of Florida alumni
Brandeis University alumni
Living people
1938 births
American women novelists
Writers from Brooklyn
California Institute of Technology faculty
Stegner Fellows
American women short story writers
20th-century American novelists
20th-century American women writers
21st-century American novelists
21st-century American women writers
20th-century American short story writers
21st-century American short story writers
Novelists from New York (state)